The 1996 San Diego Padres season was the 28th season in franchise history. They finished in first place in the NL West with a 90-72 won-loss record, one game ahead of the Los Angeles Dodgers.

Offseason
 October 28, 1995: Rico Rossy was signed as a free agent with the San Diego Padres.
 November 29, 1995: Mike Sharperson signed as a free agent with the San Diego Padres.
 December 7, 1995: Fernando Valenzuela signed as a free agent with the San Diego Padres.
 December 14, 1995: Doug Dascenzo was signed as a free agent with the San Diego Padres.
 December 21, 1995: Wally Joyner was traded by the Kansas City Royals with Aaron Dorlarque (minors) to the San Diego Padres for Bip Roberts and Bryan Wolff (minors).
 December 21, 1995: Mike Oquist was signed as a free agent with the San Diego Padres.
 December 29, 1995: Rickey Henderson signed as a free agent with the San Diego Padres.
March 22, 1996: Melvin Nieves was traded by the San Diego Padres with Raul Casanova and Richie Lewis to the Detroit Tigers for Sean Bergman, Todd Steverson, and Cade Gaspar (minors).

Regular season
On August 16, the San Diego Padres played the New York Mets in a game held at the Estadio de Béisbol Monterrey in Monterrey, Mexico.

Opening Day starters
 Brad Ausmus
 Ken Caminiti
 Andújar Cedeño
 Steve Finley
 Tony Gwynn
 Joey Hamilton
 Rickey Henderson
 Wally Joyner
 Jody Reed

Season standings

Record vs. opponents

Game log

|- bgcolor="ffbbbb"
| 1 || April 1 || @ Cubs || 4–5 (10) || Patterson || Hoffman (0–1) || — || 38,734 || 0–1
|- bgcolor="ccffcc"
| 2 || April 3 || @ Cubs || 7–5 || Hamilton (1–0) || Castillo || Hoffman (1) || 29,638 || 1–1
|- bgcolor="ccffcc"
| 3 || April 5 || @ Astros || 10–4 || Tewksbury (1–0) || Kile || — || 28,629 || 2–1
|- bgcolor="ccffcc"
| 4 || April 6 || @ Astros || 8–4 (13) || Hoffman (1–1) || Small || — || 24,510 || 3–1
|- bgcolor="ccffcc"
| 5 || April 7 || @ Astros || 17–2 || Bergman (1–0) || Swindell || — || 16,258 || 4–1
|- bgcolor="ccffcc"
| 6 || April 8 || Marlins || 9–2 || Hamilton (2–0) || Hammond || — || 44,470 || 5–1
|- bgcolor="ffbbbb"
| 7 || April 9 || Marlins || 2–5 (10) || Leiter || Blair (0–1) || — || 15,160 || 5–2
|- bgcolor="ccffcc"
| 8 || April 10 || Marlins || 3–0 || Tewksbury (2–0) || Rapp || Hoffman (2) || 10,510 || 6–2
|- bgcolor="ccffcc"
| 9 || April 11 || Braves || 2–1 || Ashby (1–0) || Maddux || Hoffman (3) || 19,047 || 7–2
|- bgcolor="ffbbbb"
| 10 || April 12 || Braves || 3–5 || Schmidt || Bergman (1–1) || Wohlers || 25,747 || 7–3
|- bgcolor="ccffcc"
| 11 || April 13 || Braves || 6–2 || Hamilton (3–0) || Glavine || Bochtler (1) || 45,250 || 8–3
|- bgcolor="ffbbbb"
| 12 || April 14 || Braves || 0–4 || Smoltz || Valenzuela (0–1) || — || 45,014 || 8–4
|- bgcolor="ffbbbb"
| 13 || April 15 || @ Rockies || 9–11 || Ruffin || Blair (0–2) || Leskanic || 48,027 || 8–5
|- bgcolor="ccffcc"
| 14 || April 16 || @ Rockies || 10–6 || Ashby (2–0) || Reynoso || — || 48,031 || 9–5
|- bgcolor="ccffcc"
| 15 || April 17 || @ Rockies || 11–6 || Florie (1–0) || Freeman || — || 48,011 || 10–5
|- bgcolor="ffbbbb"
| 16 || April 19 || @ Braves || 1–7 || Smoltz || Hamilton (3–1) || — || 27,375 || 10–6
|- bgcolor="ffbbbb"
| 17 || April 20 || @ Braves || 5–6 || McMichael || Bochtler (0–1) || Wohlers || 31,893 || 10–7
|- bgcolor="ccffcc"
| 18 || April 21 || @ Braves || 2–1 (15) || Worrell (1–0) || Thobe || Bochtler (2) || 28,829 || 11–7
|- bgcolor="ccffcc"
| 19 || April 22 || @ Marlins || 5–3 || Ashby (3–0) || Burkett || — || 17,473 || 12–7
|- bgcolor="ccffcc"
| 20 || April 23 || @ Marlins || 7–2 || Bergman (2–1) || Hammond || — || 19,667 || 13–7
|- bgcolor="ccffcc"
| 21 || April 24 || Cubs || 5–4 || Hamilton (4–1) || Foster || Hoffman (4) || 15,608 || 14–7
|- bgcolor="ccffcc"
| 22 || April 25 || Cubs || 8–3 || Tewksbury (3–0) || Bullinger || — || 18,736 || 15–7
|- bgcolor="ccffcc"
| 23 || April 26 || Astros || 3–2 || Worrell (2–0) || Hampton || Hoffman (5) || 21,254 || 16–7
|- bgcolor="ffbbbb"
| 24 || April 27 || Astros || 0–6 || Reynolds || Ashby (3–1) || — || 38,309 || 16–8
|- bgcolor="ffbbbb"
| 25 || April 28 || Astros || 2–3 || Kile || Bergman (2–2) || Jones || 27,208 || 16–9
|- bgcolor="ccffcc"
| 26 || April 29 || Astros || 2–0 || Hamilton (5–1) || Brocail || — || 8,979 || 17–9
|- bgcolor="ffbbbb"
| 27 || April 30 || Giants || 4–9 || Watson || Tewksbury (3–1) || — || 14,170 || 17–10
|-

|- bgcolor="ccffcc"
| 28 || May 1 || Giants || 9–4 || Valenzuela (1–1) || Gardner || — || 14,878 || 18–10
|- bgcolor="ffbbbb"
| 29 || May 3 || Cardinals || 1–3 || Osborne || Ashby (3–2) || Eckersley || 21,335 || 18–11
|- bgcolor="ffbbbb"
| 30 || May 4 || Cardinals || 3–4 || Stottlemyre || Bergman (2–3) || Eckersley || 44,375 || 18–12
|- bgcolor="ccffcc"
| 31 || May 5 || Cardinals || 10–4 || Hamilton (6–1) || Benes || — || 27,435 || 19–12
|- bgcolor="ccffcc"
| 32 || May 8 || @ Pirates || 5–4 || Tewksbury (4–1) || May || Hoffman (6) || — || 20–12
|- bgcolor="ffbbbb"
| 33 || May 8 || @ Pirates || 3–4 || Christiansen || Sanders (0–1) || Cordova || 8,508 || 20–13
|- bgcolor="ccffcc"
| 34 || May 9 || @ Pirates || 7–1 || Ashby (4–2) || Wagner || — || 10,863 || 21–13
|- bgcolor="ffbbbb"
| 35 || May 10 || @ Reds || 6–8 || McElroy || Florie (1–1) || Brantley || 22,508 || 21–14
|- bgcolor="ffbbbb"
| 36 || May 11 || @ Reds || 0–1 || Smiley || Hamilton (6–2) || Brantley || 24,983 || 21–15
|- bgcolor="ccffcc"
| 37 || May 12 || @ Reds || 5–0 || Tewksbury (5–1) || Burba || — || 22,786 || 22–15
|- bgcolor="ccffcc"
| 38 || May 13 || Mets || 5–2 || Valenzuela (2–1) || Isringhausen || — || 12,829 || 23–15
|- bgcolor="ccffcc"
| 39 || May 14 || Mets || 9–4 || Ashby (5–2) || Wilson || — || 12,168 || 24–15
|- bgcolor="ccffcc"
| 40 || May 15 || Mets || 4–3 (10) || Worrell (3–0) || Franco || — || 12,166 || 25–15
|- bgcolor="ffbbbb"
| 41 || May 16 || Mets || 3–6 || Harnisch || Hamilton (6–3) || Franco || 17,341 || 25–16
|- bgcolor="ccffcc"
| 42 || May 17 || Expos || 2–1 (12) || Hoffman (2–1) || Rojas || — || 26,469 || 26–16
|- bgcolor="ffbbbb"
| 43 || May 18 || Expos || 2–3 || Urbina || Valenzuela (2–2) || Rojas || 31,749 || 26–17
|- bgcolor="ccffcc"
| 44 || May 19 || Expos || 4–3 || Worrell (4–0) || Veres || Hoffman (7) || 28,769 || 27–17
|- bgcolor="ffbbbb"
| 45 || May 21 || Phillies || 4–5 || Mulholland || Bergman (2–4) || Bottalico || 11,954 || 27–18
|- bgcolor="ccffcc"
| 46 || May 22 || Phillies || 5–2 || Hamilton (7–3) || Grace || Hoffman (8) || 13,118 || 28–18
|- bgcolor="ccffcc"
| 47 || May 23 || Phillies || 7–5 || Sanders (1–1) || Springer || Hoffman (9) || 16,632 || 29–18
|- bgcolor="ccffcc"
| 48 || May 24 || @ Mets || 13–1 || Valenzuela (3–2) || Isringhausen || — || 24,751 || 30–18
|- bgcolor="ccffcc"
| 49 || May 25 || @ Mets || 7–2 || Ashby (6–2) || Wilson || — || 21,057 || 31–18
|- bgcolor="ffbbbb"
| 50 || May 26 || @ Mets || 0–1 || Jones || Bergman (2–5) || Franco || 20,405 || 31–19
|- bgcolor="ccffcc"
| 51 || May 27 || @ Expos || 4–3 || Hamilton (8–3) || Fassero || Hoffman (10) || 44,636 || 32–19
|- bgcolor="ccffcc"
| 52 || May 28 || @ Expos || 3–2 (10) || Hoffman (3–1) || Scott || Bochtler (3) || 16,537 || 33–19
|- bgcolor="ffbbbb"
| 53 || May 29 || @ Expos || 4–9 || Urbina || Valenzuela (3–3) || — || 14,386 || 33–20
|- bgcolor="ccffcc"
| 54 || May 31 || @ Phillies || 4–2 || Ashby (7–2) || Mulholland || Hoffman (11) || 22,110 || 34–20
|-

|- bgcolor="ccffcc"
| 55 || June 1 || @ Phillies || 8–3 || Bergman (3–5) || Mimbs || — || 27,623 || 35–20
|- bgcolor="ffbbbb"
| 56 || June 2 || @ Phillies || 8–9 (12) || Borland || Hoffman (3–2) || — || 32,035 || 35–21
|- bgcolor="ffbbbb"
| 57 || June 3 || Cardinals || 0–3 || Benes || Tewksbury (5–2) || — || 13,625 || 35–22
|- bgcolor="ffbbbb"
| 58 || June 4 || Cardinals || 5–11 || Petkovsek || Worrell (4–1) || — || 13,427 || 35–23
|- bgcolor="ccffcc"
| 59 || June 5 || Cardinals || 6–4 || Hoffman (4–2) || Fossas || — || 12,216 || 36–23
|- bgcolor="ffbbbb"
| 60 || June 7 || Pirates || 0–10 || Smith || Bergman (3–6) || — || 20,312 || 36–24
|- bgcolor="ffbbbb"
| 61 || June 8 || Pirates || 8–9 (14) || Cordova || Blair (0–3) || — || 41,378 || 36–25
|- bgcolor="ffbbbb"
| 62 || June 9 || Pirates || 0–6 || Darwin || Tewksbury (5–3) || — || 30,932 || 36–26
|- bgcolor="ffbbbb"
| 63 || June 10 || Reds || 3–6 || Smith || Bochtler (0–2) || Brantley || 41,120 || 36–27
|- bgcolor="ffbbbb"
| 64 || June 11 || Reds || 1–4 || Jarvis || Valenzuela (3–4) || Brantley || 12,029 || 36–28
|- bgcolor="ffbbbb"
| 65 || June 12 || Reds || 4–9 || Smiley || Florie (1–2) || — || 11,411 || 36–29
|- bgcolor="ffbbbb"
| 66 || June 13 || @ Cubs || 3–6 (14) || Jones || Blair (0–4) || — || 28,953 || 36–30
|- bgcolor="ffbbbb"
| 67 || June 14 || @ Cubs || 1–5 || Trachsel || Tewksbury (5–4) || — || 30,877 || 36–31
|- bgcolor="ccffcc"
| 68 || June 15 || @ Cubs || 2–1 || Worrell (5–1) || Navarro || Hoffman (12) || 39,465 || 37–31
|- bgcolor="ffbbbb"
| 69 || June 16 || @ Cubs || 4–8 || Castillo || Valenzuela (3–5) || Bullinger || 33,376 || 37–32
|- bgcolor="ffbbbb"
| 70 || June 17 || @ Braves || 3–9 || Maddux || Bergman (3–7) || — || 32,934 || 37–33
|- bgcolor="ffbbbb"
| 71 || June 18 || @ Braves || 3–5 || Clontz || Hamilton (8–4) || Wohlers || 32,730 || 37–34
|- bgcolor="ffbbbb"
| 72 || June 19 || @ Braves || 1–5 || Smoltz || Tewksbury (5–5) || — || 34,823 || 37–35
|- bgcolor="ffbbbb"
| 73 || June 20 || Cubs || 2–3 || Navarro || Worrell (5–2) || Wendell || 19,969 || 37–36
|- bgcolor="ccffcc"
| 74 || June 21 || Cubs || 2–1 (10) || Hoffman (5–2) || Wendell || — || 49,503 || 38–36
|- bgcolor="ffbbbb"
| 75 || June 22 || Cubs || 6–9 (16) || Myers || Blair (0–5) || — || 51,917 || 38–37
|- bgcolor="ccffcc"
| 76 || June 23 || Cubs || 5–4 || Hamilton (9–4) || Telemaco || Hoffman (13) || 30,672 || 39–37
|- bgcolor="ffbbbb"
| 77 || June 25 || Astros || 4–9 || Jones || Sanders (1–2) || — || 13,458 || 39–38
|- bgcolor="ffbbbb"
| 78 || June 26 || Astros || 3–4 || Wall || Worrell (5–3) || Wagner || 12,388 || 39–39
|- bgcolor="ccffcc"
| 79 || June 27 || @ Giants || 11–1 || Valenzuela (4–5) || Gardner || — || 12,325 || 40–39
|- bgcolor="ccffcc"
| 80 || June 28 || @ Giants || 6–1 || Ashby (8–2) || Fernandez || Hoffman (14) || 13,129 || 41–39
|- bgcolor="ccffcc"
| 81 || June 29 || @ Giants || 7–6 || Blair (1–5) || Beck || Hoffman (15) || 24,540 || 42–39
|- bgcolor="ccffcc"
| 82 || June 30 || @ Giants || 7–4 || Tewksbury (6–5) || VanLandingham || Hoffman (16) || 26,373 || 43–39
|-

|- bgcolor="ffbbbb"
| 83 || July 1 || Dodgers || 2–10 || Candiotti || Worrell (5–4) || — || 40,343 || 43–40
|- bgcolor="ffbbbb"
| 84 || July 2 || Dodgers || 3–7 || Astacio || Valenzuela (4–6) || — || 28,294 || 43–41
|- bgcolor="ccffcc"
| 85 || July 3 || Dodgers || 3–2 || Hamilton (10–4) || Martinez || Hoffman (17) || 48,841 || 44–41
|- bgcolor="ccffcc"
| 86 || July 4 || Giants || 8–4 || Tewksbury (7–5) || Leiter || — || 14,111 || 45–41
|- bgcolor="ccffcc"
| 87 || July 5 || Giants || 7–6 (11) || Bergman (4–7) || Bautista || — || 22,589 || 46–41
|- bgcolor="ccffcc"
| 88 || July 6 || Giants || 7–3 || Worrell (6–4) || Bourgeois || Hoffman (18) || 51,021 || 47–41
|- bgcolor="ccffcc"
| 89 || July 7 || Giants || 10–3 || Valenzuela (5–6) || Fernandez || — || 32,693 || 48–41
|- bgcolor="ffbbbb"
| 90 || July 11 || @ Rockies || 5–8 (10) || Ruffin || Hoffman (5–3) || — || 45,703 || 48–42
|- bgcolor="ffbbbb"
| 91 || July 12 || @ Rockies || 12–13 || Holmes || Blair (1–6) || — || 48,053 || 48–43
|- bgcolor="ffbbbb"
| 92 || July 13 || @ Rockies || 6–11 || Ritz || Sanders (1–3) || — || 48,009 || 48–44
|- bgcolor="ffbbbb"
| 93 || July 14 || @ Rockies || 4–8 || Reynoso || Valenzuela (5–7) || — || 48,065 || 48–45
|- bgcolor="ffbbbb"
| 94 || July 15 || @ Dodgers || 0–1 (10) || Guthrie || Hoffman (5–4) || — || 44,368 || 48–46
|- bgcolor="ccffcc"
| 95 || July 16 || @ Dodgers || 10–1 || Tewksbury (8–5) || Martinez || Worrell (1) || 52,436 || 49–46
|- bgcolor="ccffcc"
| 96 || July 17 || @ Dodgers || 5–4 || Florie (2–2) || Osuna || Hoffman (19) || 42,423 || 50–46
|- bgcolor="ccffcc"
| 97 || July 18 || Rockies || 9–2 || Sanders (2–3) || Ritz || — || 24,212 || 51–46
|- bgcolor="ccffcc"
| 98 || July 19 || Rockies || 4–3 || Valenzuela (6–7) || Reynoso || Hoffman (20) || 26,559 || 52–46
|- bgcolor="ffbbbb"
| 99 || July 20 || Rockies || 4–5 || Leskanic || Bochtler (0–3) || Ruffin || 55,046 || 52–47
|- bgcolor="ccffcc"
| 100 || July 21 || Rockies || 2–0 || Tewksbury (9–5) || Freeman || Hoffman (21) || 36,686 || 53–47
|- bgcolor="ffbbbb"
| 101 || July 22 || @ Astros || 0–1 || Reynolds || Hamilton (10–5) || Wagner || 21,563 || 53–48
|- bgcolor="ccffcc"
| 102 || July 23 || @ Astros || 7–4 || Sanders (3–3) || Hampton || Hoffman (22) || 19,620 || 54–48
|- bgcolor="ffbbbb"
| 103 || July 24 || @ Astros || 4–6 (10) || Hernandez || Villone (0–1) || — || 19,168 || 54–49
|- bgcolor="ccffcc"
| 104 || July 26 || @ Marlins || 3–0 (11) || Hoffman (6–4) || Pall || — || 19,677 || 55–49
|- bgcolor="ccffcc"
| 105 || July 27 || @ Marlins || 20–12 || Villone (1–1) || Mathews || — || 26,182 || 56–49
|- bgcolor="ffbbbb"
| 106 || July 28 || @ Marlins || 2–8 || Leiter || Hamilton (10–6) || — || 22,683 || 56–50
|- bgcolor="ccffcc"
| 107 || July 29 || @ Marlins || 5–3 || Sanders (4–3) || Brown || Hoffman (23) || 18,281 || 57–50
|- bgcolor="ccffcc"
| 108 || July 30 || Braves || 2–1 || Valenzuela (7–7) || Maddux || Hoffman (24) || 24,110 || 58–50
|- bgcolor="ffbbbb"
| 109 || July 31 || Braves || 4–7 || Glavine || Tewksbury (9–6) || Wohlers || 24,254 || 58–51
|-

|- bgcolor="ffbbbb"
| 110 || August 1 || Braves || 2–3 || Bielecki || Worrell (6–5) || Wohlers || 24,089 || 58–52
|- bgcolor="ccffcc"
| 111 || August 2 || Marlins || 2–1 || Hoffman (7–4) || Perez || — || 18,239 || 59–52
|- bgcolor="ffbbbb"
| 112 || August 3 || Marlins || 2–5 || Brown || Sanders (4–4) || Nen || 55,412 || 59–53
|- bgcolor="ccffcc"
| 113 || August 4 || Marlins || 6–4 || Valenzuela (8–7) || Hammond || Hoffman (25) || 35,302 || 60–53
|- bgcolor="ffbbbb"
| 114 || August 5 || @ Cardinals || 2–8 || Benes || Tewksbury (9–7) || — || 28,653 || 60–54
|- bgcolor="ccffcc"
| 115 || August 6 || @ Cardinals || 1–0 || Worrell (7–5) || Osborne || Hoffman (26) || 25,782 || 61–54
|- bgcolor="ffbbbb"
| 116 || August 7 || @ Cardinals || 0–1 || Petkovsek || Bochtler (0–4) || — || 24,823 || 61–55
|- bgcolor="ccffcc"
| 117 || August 8 || @ Pirates || 12–3 || Sanders (5–4) || Peters || — || 8,388 || 62–55
|- bgcolor="ccffcc"
| 118 || August 9 || @ Pirates || 4–1 || Valenzuela (9–7) || Miceli || Hoffman (27) || 30,066 || 63–55
|- bgcolor="ccffcc"
| 119 || August 10 || @ Pirates || 6–2 || Veras (1–0) || Plesac || — || 21,902 || 64–55
|- bgcolor="ccffcc"
| 120 || August 11 || @ Pirates || 7–5 || Bergman (5–7) || Parris || Hoffman (28) || 27,227 || 65–55
|- bgcolor="ffbbbb"
| 121 || August 13 || @ Reds || 4–10 || Jarvis || Hamilton (10–7) || — || 20,205 || 65–56
|- bgcolor="ffbbbb"
| 122 || August 14 || @ Reds || 1–2 (13) || Smith || Bergman (5–8) || — || 20,983 || 65–57
|- bgcolor="ffbbbb"
| 123 || August 15 || @ Reds || 2–3 || Burba || Tewksbury (9–8) || Brantley || 23,143 || 65–58
|- bgcolor="ccffcc"
| 124 || August 16 || Mets || 15–10 || Valenzuela (10–7) || Person || — || 23,699 || 66–58
|- bgcolor="ffbbbb"
| 125 || August 17 || Mets || 3–7 || Clark || Worrell (7–6) || Henry || 20,873 || 66–59
|- bgcolor="ccffcc"
| 126 || August 18 || Mets || 8–0 || Hamilton (11–7) || Wilson || — || 22,810 || 67–59
|- bgcolor="ccffcc"
| 127 || August 19 || Expos || 7–3 || Sanders (6–4) || Martinez || Hoffman (29) || 33,490 || 68–59
|- bgcolor="ccffcc"
| 128 || August 20 || Expos || 3–0 || Tewksbury (10–8) || Cormier || Hoffman (30) || 18,426 || 69–59
|- bgcolor="ccffcc"
| 129 || August 21 || Expos || 7–2 || Valenzuela (11–7) || Urbina || — || 29,182 || 70–59
|- bgcolor="ffbbbb"
| 130 || August 23 || Phillies || 4–7 || Hunter || Worrell (7–7) || Bottalico || 22,102 || 70–60
|- bgcolor="ccffcc"
| 131 || August 24 || Phillies || 7–1 || Hamilton (12–7) || Beech || — || 31,023 || 71–60
|- bgcolor="ccffcc"
| 132 || August 25 || Phillies || 11–2 || Sanders (7–4) || West || — || 30,036 || 72–60
|- bgcolor="ccffcc"
| 133 || August 27 || @ Mets || 4–3 || Blair (2–6) || Mlicki || Hoffman (31) || 17,925 || 73–60
|- bgcolor="ccffcc"
| 134 || August 28 || @ Mets || 3–2 (12) || Bergman (6–8) || Wallace || Hoffman (32) || 17,442 || 74–60
|- bgcolor="ccffcc"
| 135 || August 29 || @ Mets || 3–2 || Hamilton (13–7) || Wilson || Hoffman (33) || 17,016 || 75–60
|- bgcolor="ccffcc"
| 136 || August 30 || @ Expos || 6–0 || Sanders (8–4) || Paniagua || — || 14,133 || 76–60
|- bgcolor="ffbbbb"
| 137 || August 31 || @ Expos || 2–4 || Daal || Tewksbury (10–9) || Rojas || 18,235 || 76–61
|-

|- bgcolor="ffbbbb"
| 138 || September 1 || @ Expos || 6–7 || Fassero || Ashby (8–3) || Rojas || 20,666 || 76–62
|- bgcolor="ccffcc"
| 139 || September 2 || @ Phillies || 5–1 || Valenzuela (12–7) || Hunter || — || 15,263 || 77–62
|- bgcolor="ffbbbb"
| 140 || September 3 || @ Phillies || 2–8 || Mimbs || Hamilton (13–8) || Ryan || 16,797 || 77–63
|- bgcolor="ccffcc"
| 141 || September 4 || @ Phillies || 2–1 || Sanders (9–4) || Beech || Hoffman (34) || 18,754 || 78–63
|- bgcolor="ffbbbb"
| 142 || September 6 || @ Cardinals || 3–8 || Petkovsek || Tewksbury (10–10) || — || 28,116 || 78–64
|- bgcolor="ffbbbb"
| 143 || September 7 || @ Cardinals || 3–8 || Osborne || Ashby (8–4) || — || 42,846 || 78–65
|- bgcolor="ccffcc"
| 144 || September 8 || @ Cardinals || 5–4 || Valenzuela (13–7) || Stottlemyre || Hoffman (35) || 30,897 || 79–65
|- bgcolor="ccffcc"
| 145 || September 9 || Pirates || 6–5 || Hermanson (1–0) || Wilkins || Hoffman (36) || 15,727 || 80–65
|- bgcolor="ccffcc"
| 146 || September 10 || Pirates || 6–5 || Hoffman (8–4) || Boever || — || 15,694 || 81–65
|- bgcolor="ccffcc"
| 147 || September 11 || Pirates || 8–7 || Bochtler (1–4) || Ericks || — || 33,771 || 82–65
|- bgcolor="ffbbbb"
| 148 || September 13 || Reds || 1–3 || Morgan || Ashby (8–5) || Brantley || 26,524 || 82–66
|- bgcolor="ccffcc"
| 149 || September 14 || Reds || 3–2 (12) || Veras (2–0) || Smith || — || 25,231 || 83–66
|- bgcolor="ccffcc"
| 150 || September 15 || Reds || 8–0 || Hamilton (14–8) || Jarvis || Blair (1) || 29,005 || 84–66
|- bgcolor="ccffcc"
| 151 || September 16 || @ Giants || 2–1 (11) || Hoffman (9–4) || Beck || — || 8,853 || 85–66
|- bgcolor="ffbbbb"
| 152 || September 17 || @ Giants || 7–9 || Poole || Veras (2–1) || Beck || 12,737 || 85–67
|- bgcolor="ccffcc"
| 153 || September 18 || @ Giants || 8–5 || Bochtler (2–4) || DeLucia || Hoffman (37) || 11,996 || 86–67
|- bgcolor="ffbbbb"
| 154 || September 19 || Dodgers || 0–7 || Martinez || Valenzuela (13–8) || — || 41,287 || 86–68
|- bgcolor="ccffcc"
| 155 || September 20 || Dodgers || 4–2 || Hamilton (15–8) || Candiotti || Hoffman (38) || 51,217 || 87–68
|- bgcolor="ffbbbb"
| 156 || September 21 || Dodgers || 2–9 || Valdez || Sanders (9–5) || — || 53,629 || 87–69
|- bgcolor="ccffcc"
| 157 || September 22 || Dodgers || 3–2 || Ashby (9–5) || Nomo || Hoffman (39) || 51,092 || 88–69
|- bgcolor="ffbbbb"
| 158 || September 24 || Rockies || 4–5 (11) || Ruffin || Hoffman (9–5) || Swift || 23,556 || 88–70
|- bgcolor="ffbbbb"
| 159 || September 25 || Rockies || 3–5 || Thompson || Hamilton (15–9) || Ruffin || 32,706 || 88–71
|- bgcolor="ccffcc"
| 160 || September 27 || @ Dodgers || 5–2 (10) || Worrell (8–7) || Osuna || Hoffman (40) || 53,294 || 89–71
|- bgcolor="ccffcc"
| 161 || September 28 || @ Dodgers || 4–2 || Worrell (9–7) || Dreifort || Hoffman (41) || 52,977 || 90–71
|- bgcolor="ccffcc"
| 162 || September 29 || @ Dodgers || 2–0 (11) || Veras (3–1) || Park || Hoffman (42) || 53,270 || 91–71
|-

|-
| Legend:       = Win       = LossBold = Padres team member

Detailed records

Notable transactions
July 31, 1996: Marc Newfield was traded by the San Diego Padres with Bryce Florie and Ron Villone to the Milwaukee Brewers for a player to be named later and Greg Vaughn. The Milwaukee Brewers sent Gerald Parent (minors) (September 16, 1996) to the San Diego Padres to complete the trade.

Roster

Player stats

Batting

Starters by position
Note: Pos = Position; G = Games played; AB = At bats; H = Hits; Avg. = Batting average; HR = Home runs; RBI = Runs batted in

Other batters
Note: G = Games played; AB = At bats; H = Hits; Avg. = Batting average; HR = Home runs; RBI = Runs batted in

Pitching

Starting pitchers
Note: G = Games pitched; IP = Innings pitched; W = Wins; L = Losses; ERA = Earned run average; SO = Strikeouts

Other pitchers
Note: G = Games pitched; IP = Innings pitched; W = Wins; L = Losses; ERA = Earned run average; SO = Strikeouts

Relief pitchers
Note: G = Games pitched; W = Wins; L = Losses; SV = Saves; ERA = Earned run average; SO = Strikeouts

National League Division Series

St. Louis Cardinals vs. San Diego Padres
St. Louis wins the series, 3-0

The Cardinals and Padres began their rivalry in this series. The Cardinals' first of three postseason victories against the Padres took place here. Their dominance is overwhelming to the tune of only one loss against the Padres lifetime in the postseason. 

A 3-run homer by Gary Gaetti off Joey Hamilton in Game 1 put the Cardinals up for good. Todd Stottlemyre pitched masterfully, allowing only one earned run on a solo home run by Rickey Henderson. Rick Honeycutt and Dennis Eckersley shut the Padres down for the win. 

A well fought Game 2 saw the Cardinals squander two leads. Scott Sanders faced Andy Benes. Willie McGee put the Cardinals on top on the 3rd with an RBI single. Ken Caminiti tied the game with a leadoff homer in the 5th. Ron Gant cleared the bases with a double in the Cardinals 5th to make it 4-1. A 2 run single by Tony Gwynn made it a one run game in the Padres 6th. An RBI ground out by Steve Finley tied the game in the Padres 8th. But the Cardinals would score a run in the 8th on an RBI ground out that scored Brian Jordan. Dennis Eckersley got his 2nd save of the postseason. 

In Game 3, the Cardinals looked to Donovan Osborne to put the Padres away. Opposing the potential sweep would be Andy Ashby. Brian Jordan put the Cardinals ahead when he singled to center field to score Royce Clayton. A would-be double play ball in the bottom of the 2nd helped the Padres take the lead 2-1. Then Ken Caminiti homered to make it 3-1 in the 3rd. An RBI single in the bottom of the 4th made it 4-1 Padres and Osborne was done. But the Cardinals were not about to let the series go another game. A leadoff homer by Ron Gant made it 4-2 in the 6th. But a one-out triple by John Mabry scored Jordan and a single would bring him home to tie the game at 4. The Cardinals would take the lead in the 7th when Ray Lankford scored on a double play. The Padres were now 6 outs from being eliminated. But when Caminiti hit his second homer of the game to tie it at 5, the Padres were still alive. However, the Cardinals put the game away in the top of the 9th when Jordan hit a two-run homer that proved to be the series winner. A one-out single by Rickey Henderson in the 9th put the tying run at the plate but nothing would be made of it as Eckersley got his 3rd save in as many tries to win the series.

Award winners
 Ken Caminiti, National League Most Valuable Player
1996 Major League Baseball All-Star Game
 Tony Gwynn
 Ken Caminiti

Farm system

References

External links
 1996 San Diego Padres at Baseball Reference
 1996 San Diego Padres at Baseball Almanac

San Diego Padres seasons
San Diego Padres Season, 1996
National League West champion seasons
San Diego Padres
San Diego Padres